Colin Murphy (born 16 July 1968) is a Northern Irish comedian from Downpatrick, County Down, Northern Ireland. He now lives in south Belfast. He is best known for his television work hosting and co-writing The Blizzard of Odd, The Unbelievable Truth, and as resident panellist on The Blame Game for BBC Northern Ireland and The Panel for RTÉ.

He has also acted in the film Divorcing Jack with Rachel Griffiths and David Thewlis.

Public appearances
Murphy mainly tours in Ireland and usually hosts the comedy show in The Empire Bar, Belfast. He occasionally appears at other venues in the UK such as the Edinburgh Fringe Festival, and has performed at Kilkenny Cat Laughs, Melbourne Comedy Festival, and Just for Laughs. He was host of Queen's Comedy Club, which ran in the Mandela Hall of the Queen's University Belfast Students' Union until 2018.

Television credits
Murphy has appeared on the following programmes:

Elvis Has Left the Building
This Is Ireland
All New Comedy Store (Five & Paramount)
Comic Asides 2
Hey Hey It’s Saturday (Channel 9 Australia)
The Stand Up Show 
Don't Shoot the Messenger
The Return of the Empire
Something for the Weekend
Eureka Street
Big Bad World
People Like Us
I Fought the Law
Colin Murphy's Paper Chase
Colin Murphy's Great Unanswered Questions
 "The Blizzard of Odd" (RTÉ)
The Panel (RTÉ)
The Blame Game
 "Xit File" (RTÉ)
 "Xit Poll" (RTÉ)
 "The Will Of The People"
 "Ad Fads"
 "TV Fads"
 "Hey Ho Lets Go!" (RTÉ)
Colin Murphy's Panic Room (BBC 1)

Philanthropy
Murphy has done charity work for Plan Ireland, including making a film about work done by the charity.

References

1968 births
Living people
Male film actors from Northern Ireland
Male comedians from Northern Ireland
Male actors from Belfast
People from Downpatrick
The Panel (Irish TV series) presenters
Male television actors from Northern Ireland